Results from Norwegian football in the year 1908.

Cup

Smaalenene Qualifying
Kvik (Fredrikshald) qualified

Kristiania og omegn Qualifying
Lyn qualified

First round

|colspan="3" style="background-color:#97DEFF"|5 September 1908

Odd had a walkover.
Kvik (Fredrikshald) had a walkover.
Ørn had a walkover.

Semi-finals

|colspan="3" style="background-color:#97DEFF"|12 September 1908

Final

National team

Sources:

References

External links
RSSSF Football Archive

 
Seasons in Norwegian football